Dubtsy is a rural locality (a village) in Lyakhovskoye Rural Settlement, Melenkovsky District, Vladimir Oblast, Russia. The population was 16 as of 2010. There are 2 streets.

Geography 
Dubtsy is located 14 km east of Melenki (the district's administrative centre) by road. Panovo is the nearest rural locality.

References 

Rural localities in Melenkovsky District